Albert Plummer (August 9, 1840 – March 20, 1912) was an American physician and legislator.

Born in Auburn, New Hampshire, Plummer graduated from Kimball Union Academy in Meriden, New Hampshire, and received his medical degree from Bowdoin College. He served in the 10th New Hampshire Volunteer Infantry during the American Civil War as a surgeon. In 1867, Plummer moved to Hamilton, Minnesota where he practiced medicine. In 1883–1884, he served in the Minnesota House of Representatives. He died in Rochester, Minnesota. He was the father of Dr. Henry Stanley Plummer, an early partner of the Mayo brothers and one of the founders of the Mayo Clinic.

Notes

External links
 

1840 births
1912 deaths
People from Auburn, New Hampshire
People from Fillmore County, Minnesota
People of New Hampshire in the American Civil War
Physicians from Minnesota
Physicians from New Hampshire
Members of the Minnesota House of Representatives
19th-century American politicians